The Imperial Golden Crown Harmonizers are an American non-denominational all-inclusive soulful funky gospel band, that passes all revenues to charity. The band has raised several thousands of dollars over the years for central Texas charities, such as the SIMS Foundation and Habitat for Humanity.

IGCH variously features Gurf Morlix, Nick Connolly, Sarah Brown, Paul Buddha Mills, Scrappy Jud Newcomb, Malcolm "Papa Mali" Welbourne, Shelley King, and Carolyn Wonderland. Also Charlie Prichard, Cindy Cashdollar, Lavelle White, Bill Kirchen, Kim Deschamps, Ruthie Foster, and Gary Primich (now deceased), have occasionally joined in.

The group currently plays every month at Maria's Taco Xpress in Austin, Texas.

External links
 Official web site
 "Charity Begins at Home:  The Gospel According to the Imperial Golden Crown Harmonizers by Jim Caligiuri, Austin Chronicle June 22, 2001
 Taco Xpress, venue where the group frequently performs

Country music groups from Texas
Charities based in Texas
American gospel musical groups
Musical groups from Texas